The hidden subgroup problem (HSP) is a topic of research in mathematics and theoretical computer science. The framework captures problems such as factoring, discrete logarithm, graph isomorphism, and the shortest vector problem. This makes it especially important in the theory of quantum computing because Shor's quantum algorithm for factoring is an instance of the hidden subgroup problem for finite Abelian groups, while the other problems correspond to finite groups that are not Abelian.

Problem statement
Given a group , a subgroup , and a set , we say a function  hides the subgroup  if for all  if and only if . Equivalently,  is constant on the cosets of H, while it is different between the different cosets of H.

Hidden subgroup problem: Let  be a group,  a finite set, and  a function that hides a subgroup . The function  is given via an oracle, which uses  bits.

Motivation
The hidden subgroup problem is especially important in the theory of quantum computing for the following reasons.

 Shor's quantum algorithm for factoring and discrete logarithm (as well as several of its extensions) relies on the ability of quantum computers to solve the HSP for finite Abelian groups.
 The existence of efficient quantum algorithms for HSPs for certain non-Abelian groups would imply efficient quantum algorithms for two major problems: the graph isomorphism problem and certain shortest vector problems (SVPs) in lattices. More precisely, an efficient quantum algorithm for the HSP for the symmetric group would give a quantum algorithm for the graph isomorphism. An efficient quantum algorithm for the HSP for the dihedral group would give a quantum algorithm for the  unique SVP.

Algorithms 

Shor's algorithm applies a particular case of this quantum algorithm.

For arbitrary groups, it is known that the hidden subgroup problem is solvable using a polynomial number of evaluations of the oracle. The existence of such an algorithm for arbitrary groups is open. Quantum polynomial time algorithms exist for certain subclasses of groups, such as semi-direct products of some Abelian groups.

To solve the problem for finite Abelian groups, the 'standard' approach to this problem involves: the creation of the quantum state , a subsequent quantum Fourier transform to the left register, after which this register gets sampled. This approach has been shown to be insufficient for the hidden subgroup problem for the symmetric group.

See also
Dual group (Quantum Computing)
Hidden shift problem

References

External links
Richard Jozsa: Quantum factoring, discrete logarithms and the hidden subgroup problem
 Chris Lomont: The Hidden Subgroup Problem - Review and Open Problems
 Hidden subgroup problem on arxiv.org

Group theory
Quantum algorithms